The ovarian ligament (also called the utero-ovarian ligament or proper ovarian ligament) is a fibrous ligament that connects the ovary to the lateral surface of the uterus.

Structure
The ovarian ligament is composed of muscular and fibrous tissue; it extends from the uterine extremity of the ovary to the lateral aspect of the uterus, just below the point where the uterine tube and uterus meet.

The ligament runs in the broad ligament of the uterus, which is a fold of peritoneum rather than a fibrous ligament. Specifically, it is located in the parametrium.

Development

Embryologically, each ovary (which forms from the gonadal ridge) is connected to a band of mesoderm, the gubernaculum. This strip of mesoderm remains in connection with the ovary throughout its development, and eventually spans this distance by attachment within the labia majora. During the latter parts of urogenital development, the gubernaculum forms a long fibrous band of connective tissue stretching from the ovary to the uterus, and then continuing into the labia majora. This connective tissue span, the remnant of the gubernaculum is separated into two parts anatomically in the adult; the length between the ovary and the uterus termed the ovarian ligament, and the longer stretch between the uterus and the labia majora, the round ligament of uterus.

Function 
The ovarian ligament anchors to the ovaries and the uterine horn.

Clinical significance 
The ovarian ligament may be stretched by particularly large ovarian cancers and other masses.

History 
The ovarian ligament is present in other mammals, including cats.

See also
 Suspensory ligament of ovary
 Fallopian tube
 Broad ligament of the uterus

References

External links
 

Mammal female reproductive system